Gonzha is a rural locality (a selo) and the administrative center of Gonzhinskoye Rural Settlement of Magdagachinsky District, Amur Oblast, Russia. The population was 735 as of 2018. There are 13 streets.

Geography 
Gonzha is located on northwest of the Amur–Zeya Plain, 40 km northwest of Magdagachi (the district's administrative centre) by road. Gudachi is the nearest rural locality.

References 

Rural localities in Magdagachinsky District